Eastwood City is a  mixed-use development complex located in Barangay Bagumbayan Quezon City. Launched in 1997, it is Megaworld Corporation’s first “live-work-play” community that offers complete facilities, amenities, and establishments for living, working, playing, and shopping.

Home to the largest business process outsourcing (BPO) locators, Eastwood City is the country’s first IT park and the first project to be granted special economic zone status by the Philippine Economic Zone Authority (PEZA). Since its establishment as a premier Cyberpark, it has become a top employer and leading dollar-earner in the Philippines. Apart from being a business community, Eastwood City is a residential community with 19 high-rise residential towers. Eastwood also is an Accredited Tourism Entertainment Complex by the Department of Tourism. Eastwood City offers families, professionals and urbanites a variety of shopping, dining and recreation offerings at its three lifestyle malls Eastwood Mall, Eastwood Cyber and Fashion Mall and Eastwood Citywalk, which are managed under the Megaworld Lifestyle Malls brand.

Features

Eastwood Mall 
 
Eastwood Mall is a four level mall opened In December 2008 that houses restaurants as well as cinemas. The mall also houses  of retail spaces.

The mall also has an open space, the Eastwood Mall Open Park, which has a lagoon and a fountain. This venue is used for large community events such as the annual New Year’s Eve countdown.

Eastwood Mall also houses four cinemas. 

It is also the first shopping center in the Philippines to welcome pets and was inducted into the Order of the Platinum Paw by the Philippine Animal Welfare Society (PAWS).

Eastwood Citywalk I and II 
Eastwood City Walk Opened In August 2000 is a combination of 2 dining strips that offers an array of restaurants and bars targeting the Manila nightlife scene as well as a variety of retail stores. Eastwood Citywalk also has an outdoor area called the Eastwood Central Plaza, which regularly hosts live performances, fairs, pet activities and other outdoor events.

It also features the Eastwood City Walk of Fame which is directly inspired by the Hollywood Walk of Fame in California, USA. This landmark was launched by the late Filipino entertainment icon ‘Master Showman’ German Moreno as a tribute to the men and women from the Philippine entertainment industry.

Eastwood Cyber and Fashion Mall 
Eastwood Cyber and Fashion Mall houses many establishments including fashion stores, book stores, beauty and wellness and more. The mall is also home to many dining establishments for employees, residents and patrons of Eastwood City.

Eastwood City Cyberpark
The Eastwood City Cyberpark is a PEZA certified business center housing major IT companies such as Atos, Accenture, Dell, eTelecare, IBM Global Services, MicroSourcing, WNS Global Services, and other BPO companies occupying its office buildings throughout the complex.

Gallery

References

External links
 Eastwood City official website

Quezon City
Districts in Metro Manila
Mixed-use developments in Metro Manila
Planned communities in the Philippines
Science parks in Metro Manila